Oyster Village (Seokhwachon) is a 1972 South Korean drama film directed by Jung Jin-woo. It was awarded Best Film at the Blue Dragon Film Awards ceremony and was nominated for the Golden Bear at the 22nd Berlin International Film Festival.

Plot
In an island village that makes its living from oyster fishing, the villagers believe that a dead person's soul cannot go to heaven until another person has died. After Byol-Rye's father drowns, her mother kills herself. Byol-Rye then marries a sickly man on the condition that his father helps Byol-Rye's mother go to heaven. Based on a novel.

Cast
Yoon Jeong-hee
Kim Hee-ra
Yoon Il-bong
Yoon In-Ja
Kim Sin-jae

References

Bibliography

External links

1972 drama films
South Korean drama films
Films based on Korean novels
Best Picture Blue Dragon Film Award winners
South Korean black-and-white films
1970s Korean-language films
Films directed by Jung Jin-woo